Askatu Bakery (sometimes Askatu Bakery and Cafe) is a bakery in Seattle's Belltown neighborhood, in the U.S. state of Washington.

Description 

The Latino- and woman-owned bakery is located in downtown Seattle's Belltown neighborhood. The business has served breads, cakes, cookies, mooncakes (including golden ube, pandan coconut, and red bean varieties), and other pastries. Askatu is known for its gluten-free options and avoids use of xanthan or guar gums. KNKX has described the business as an "allergen-free" bakery which avoids eggs, nuts, and wheat. Mooncakes are imprinted with one of four stamps with different designs. The menu has also included jackfruit-vegetable bao, cinnamon rolls, and hamantaschen.

The Seattle Metropolitan has described the business as "inherently" vegan and a "thriving, if small ... cornerstone of intentional baking". The magazine said the owner "uses mainly earth-friendly ancient grain as the base for all of their baked goods including several varieties of sorghum and millet. These grains are drought tolerant and require much less water and chemicals to grow, making for delicious earth and allergy-friendly treats." In 2021, Lindsey Kirschman of the Seattle Post-Intelligencer said the bakery "doles out goods alongside Liberated Foods, LLC, a minority- and woman-owned small business that specializes in making allergen-free baked goods and mixes to order. From the elimination of wheat, dairy, soy and eggs to nuts, peanuts, fish and shellfish, corn, rice, yeast and potatoes, the company strives to create equally tasty goods without the allergens."

History 

The business is owned by head baker Estela Martinez. Askatu Bakery has been a vendor at the farmers' market in the University District. According to the Seattle Metropolitan, the bakery is "EnviroStars-certified, a City of Seattle program that recognizes green businesses and provides free sustainability tools and resources". The business is part of the Intentionalist network, which seeks to increase awareness of minority-owned small businesses in the region.

In 2022, Askatu Bakery was a vendor at the United Way of King County's first annual barbecue festival. The business has also participated in Seattle Restaurant Week.

Reception 
Lindsey Kirschman included the bakery in the Seattle Post-Intelligencer's 2021 list of "the 14 best Seattle confectioneries for holiday sweets, treats". In 2022, Sabra Boyd of Eater Seattle wrote, "Askatu's gluten-free baguettes boast a crunchy Maillard crust and beautiful crumb when sliced; a precise mix of proteins create the texture that every nostalgic celiac or gluten-intolerant person longs for. (This might sound like over-the-top praise, but for many, life without bread can feel limiting.)" Boyd, Dylan Joffe, and Maggy Lehmicke included the bakery in a 2022 overview of "where to eat fantastic gluten-free food in Seattle".

See also 

 List of bakeries

References

External links

 Meet Our Vendors: Askatu Bakery at Seattle Neighborhood Farmers Markets

Bakeries of Washington (state)
Belltown, Seattle
Restaurants in Seattle